Shōman-ji (正満寺) is a Buddhist temple in Minato, Tokyo in Japan.

See also 
 Shōman-ji, Nagoya

External links 
 Homepage of Shōman-ji

Buddhist temples in Tokyo
Buildings and structures in Minato, Tokyo